Werman is a surname. Notable people with the surname include:

 Marco Werman, American radio personality
 Tom Werman (born 1945), American record producer

References